Giuseppe Baldrighi (12 August 1722 – 22 January 1803) was an Italian painter of the late Baroque (Rococo) and early Neoclassic periods.

Biography
Born in the town of Stradella, in Lombardy, Giuseppe Baldrighi initially trained with an unknown painter in Naples, where his family lived. By 1750, he was recruited into the Accademia Clementina of Bologna. He was the recruited to Parma, perhaps due to his skill at miniature paintings by Du Tillot, minister of Philip of Bourbon, and sent to study in Paris from 1752 to 1756. Here, he likely encountered François Boucher, Maurice Quentin de La Tour, Joseph Duplessis, Joseph Duplessis, and Alexandre-François Desportes, and became known for his watercolors and portraits. His portraits include that of duchess Louise Elizabeth, now Museo Glauco Lombardi in Parma and a Portrait of Jacopo Sanvitale in Pastoral Dress in the Rocca of Fontanellato, and a portrait of Roman Charity for the Museum of Angers.

In 1756 he became professor of the Academy of Fine Arts, and painter to the court of Parma. He actively painted for the Ducal family portraits and a Triumph of the Faith for the chapel of Colorno Palace in 1777. He died in Parma in 1803. In Spain The Prado, the Royal Palace of El Pardo and the Real Academia de Bellas Artes de San Fernando all of them in Madrid  own paintings (portraits of Bourbons) by Baldrighi.

References

Sources 
Biography for Goya exhibition
Fiere, lupi e cavalli: il bestiario dipinto di Giuseppe Baldrighi L'omaggio al pittore nel bicentenario della morte (Stradella 1722 - Parma 1803).
  Exhibit in Parma.

External links 

 Lion

1722 births
1803 deaths
People from Stradella
18th-century Italian painters
Italian male painters
19th-century Italian painters
Rococo painters
19th-century Italian male artists
18th-century Italian male artists